Chenar Bashi (also Romanized as Chenār Bāshī) is a village in بیره ی, in the کبیرکوه of Ilam County, Ilam Province, Iran. At the 2006 census, its population was 462, in 83 families. The village is populated by Kurds.

References 

Populated places in Ilam County
Kurdish settlements in Ilam Province